Roseann O'Donnell (born March 21, 1962) is an American comedian, television producer, actress, author, and television personality. She began her comedy career as a teenager and received her breakthrough on the television series Star Search in 1984. After a series of television and film roles that introduced her to a larger national audience, O'Donnell hosted her own syndicated daytime talk show, The Rosie O'Donnell Show, between 1996 and 2002, which won several Daytime Emmy Awards. During this period, she developed the nickname "Queen of Nice", as well as a reputation for philanthropic efforts.

From 2006 to 2007, O'Donnell endured a controversial run as the moderator on the daytime talk show The View, which included a public feud with Donald Trump and on-air disputes regarding the Bush administration's policies with the Iraq War. She hosted Rosie Radio on Sirius XM Radio between 2009 and 2011, and from 2011 to 2012 hosted a second, short-lived talk show on OWN, The Rosie Show. O'Donnell returned to The View in 2014, leaving after a brief five-month run due to personal issues. From 2017 to 2019, she starred on the Showtime comedy series SMILF.

In addition to comedy, film, and television, O'Donnell has also been a magazine editor, celebrity blogger, and author of several memoirs, including Find Me (2002) and Celebrity Detox (2007). She used the Find Me $3 million advance to establish her For All foundation and promote other charity projects, encouraging celebrities on her show to take part.

She has also been an outspoken advocate for lesbian rights and gay adoption issues. O'Donnell is a foster and adoptive mother. She was named The Advocate 2002 Person of the Year; in May 2003, she became a regular contributor to the magazine. O'Donnell also continues to be a television producer and a collaborative partner in the LGBT family vacation company R Family Vacations.

Early life
O'Donnell, the third of five children, was born and raised in Commack, Long Island, New York. Her parents were homemaker Roseann Teresa (née Murtha; 1934–1973) and Edward Joseph O'Donnell (1933–2015), an electrical engineer who worked in the defense industry. Edward had immigrated from County Donegal, Ireland during his childhood, and her mother was Irish American. O'Donnell was raised Roman Catholic. Her older brother is Daniel J. O'Donnell, now a member of the New York State Assembly. On March 17, 1973, four days before her 11th birthday, O'Donnell lost her mother to breast cancer. While she attended Commack High School, O'Donnell was voted homecoming queen, prom queen, senior class president, and class clown. During high school, she began exploring her interest in comedy, beginning with a skit performed in front of the school in which she imitated Gilda Radner's character Roseanne Roseannadanna. After graduating in 1980, O'Donnell briefly attended Dickinson College, later transferring to Boston University before ultimately dropping out of college.

Career

Early work
O'Donnell toured as a stand-up comedian in clubs from 1979 to 1984. She got her first big break on Star Search, explaining on Larry King Live:

After this success, she moved on to television sitcoms, making her series debut as Nell Harper's neighbor on Gimme a Break! in 1986. In 1988, she joined music video station VH1's lineup of veejays. She started hosting a series for VH1, Stand-up Spotlight, a showcase for up-and-coming comedians. In 1992, she starred in Stand By Your Man, a Fox Network sitcom co-starring Melissa Gilbert. The show bombed, just as O'Donnell's movie career took off. O'Donnell made her feature film debut in A League of Their Own (1992) alongside Tom Hanks, Geena Davis, and Madonna. She was originally considered for the role of Mary Sanderson in Disney's Hocus Pocus, but it was ultimately given to Kathy Najimy. O'Donnell claimed on her blog that she turned down the offer to work with Bette Midler because she refused to portray a frightening evil witch. Throughout her career, she has taken on an eclectic range of roles: she appeared in Sleepless in Seattle as Meg Ryan's character's best friend; as Betty Rubble in the live-action film adaptation of The Flintstones with John Goodman, Elizabeth Perkins, and Rick Moranis; as one of Timothy Hutton's co-stars in Beautiful Girls; as a federal agent comedically paired with Dan Aykroyd in Exit to Eden; as the voice of a tomboyish female gorilla named Terk in Disney's Tarzan; and as a baseball-loving nun in M. Night Shyamalan's Wide Awake.

O'Donnell was considered for the role of Elaine Benes on Seinfeld.

1996–2002: The Rosie O'Donnell Show
In 1996, she began hosting a daytime talk show, The Rosie O'Donnell Show, for her production company KidRo Productions. The show proved very successful, winning multiple Emmy Awards, and earning O'Donnell the title of "The Queen of Nice" for her style of light-hearted banter with her guests and interactions with the audience. As part of her playful banter with her studio audience, O'Donnell often launched koosh balls at the crowd and camera. She also professed an infatuation with Tom Cruise.

With New York City as the show's home base, O'Donnell displayed her love of Broadway musicals and plays by having cast members as guests, encouraging the audience to see shows, premiering production numbers as well as promoting shows with ticket giveaways.

After the Columbine shootings, O'Donnell became an outspoken supporter of gun control and a major figure in the Million Mom March. During the April 19, 1999, broadcast of her talk show, she stated, "You are not allowed to own a gun, and if you do own a gun, I think you should go to prison." O'Donnell previously had remarked, "I don't personally own a gun, but if you are qualified, licensed and registered, I have no problem." In May 1999, a month after the Columbine shootings, O'Donnell interviewed Tom Selleck, who was promoting The Love Letter. O'Donnell interrogated him about his recent unpaid commercial for the National Rifle Association (NRA) and questioned him about the NRA's position on the use of "assault weapons". She said at the end of the segment the conversation had "not gone the way I had hoped" and added "if you feel insulted by my questions, I apologize because it was not a personal attack. It was meant to bring up the subject as it is in the consciousness of so many today." Ironically, O'Donnell at that time was a multi-million dollar paid spokesperson for 5 years for Kmart, which was the largest volume firearms retailer in the United States. Around the same time, the cast from Annie Get Your Gun was to appear on the show but refused O'Donnell's request to remove the line "I can shoot a partridge with a single cartridge" from the song "Anything You Can Do" and agreed to perform "My Defenses Are Down" instead.

Later in 1999, O'Donnell discontinued her contract with Kmart as their spokeswoman, as gun enthusiasts complained that she should not be the spokesperson for the largest gun retailer. O'Donnell countered that Kmart sells hunting rifles, not handguns or assault weapons and does so legally, which she supports. Both Kmart and O'Donnell denied publicly that Kmart had terminated the contract. In May 2000, O'Donnell's bodyguard applied for a concealed firearm permit. O'Donnell stated that the security firm contracted by Warner Bros. requested the gun. O'Donnell stated that because of threats, she and her family need protection.

After the September 11, 2001 attacks, Broadway and tourism in New York City was down and many shows were in danger of closing. O'Donnell was among many in the entertainment field who encouraged viewers to visit and support the performing arts. She announced that she would donate 1 million dollars for aid in the rescue efforts and encouraged other celebrities and citizens alike to "give till it hurts".

In 2002, she left her talk show. The show was replaced by The Caroline Rhea Show, with comedian Caroline Rhea, which ran for one additional season.

O'Donnell was a guest star on an episode of HBO show Curb Your Enthusiasm entitled "The Bowtie".

2006–2007: The View

In September 2006, O'Donnell replaced Meredith Vieira as a co-host and moderator of The View, a daytime women-oriented talk show. Star Jones, a co-host on the show, quit, with some speculating Jones's conservative views would be in constant tension with O'Donnell's more liberal counterpoint. O'Donnell had also disputed Jones's route of rapid weight loss, alluding that it must have been through gastric bypass surgery, rather than dieting and exercise alone as Jones had insisted, which also fed speculation about certain tension between the two. (Jones later confirmed that surgery was involved.) O'Donnell is credited with keeping the show's "buzz factor up". She is also credited with making it more news-focused, though it still embraced the "fluff" of daytime TV talk shows (celebrities, fashion, and food). Despite an overall downward trend for most daytime broadcast shows, ratings rose by 27% during O'Donnell's first year on The View. The show was the fourth-most-watched in all of daytime in the key demographic of women ages 18–49 and scored record ratings in the total viewer category with an average of 3.4 million viewers—up 15% versus the same time in 2005. O'Donnell moderated the opening "Hot Topics" portion of the show, where news items were discussed. O'Donnell gave the show a more political slant, and she and fellow comic Joy Behar often gave strong opinions against former President Bush's domestic and foreign policies, including the Iraq War. As a conservative counterpoint, Elisabeth Hasselbeck would usually support the Bush administration's policies and the two would get into an adversarial give-and-take.

Encouraged by the show to be outspoken, O'Donnell sometimes provoked debate, at one time stating "radical Christianity is just as threatening as radical Islam." On the February 24, 2003, episode of Phil Donahue's talk show, O'Donnell referred to the sexual abuse scandal in the Catholic archdiocese of Boston resulting in $157 million awarded to 983 claimants, stating "I hope the Catholic Church gets sued until the end of time. Maybe, you know, we can melt down some of the gold toilets in the Pope's Vatican and pay off some of the lawsuits because, the whole tenet of living a Christ-like life, has been lost in Catholicism."

O'Donnell joked about communion rituals alongside co-host Behar's drunk priest comments. On April 19, 2007, the panel discussed the Supreme Court of the United States's ruling in Gonzales v. Carhart, a decision upholding the Partial-Birth Abortion Ban Act. O'Donnell cited a Florynce Kennedy quote, "If men could get pregnant abortion would be a sacrament" and asked rhetorically "How many Supreme Court judges are Catholic?" and "How about separation of church and state?" Some conservative commentators deemed her statements "anti-Catholic bigotry" and suggested that such statements against other religions would not be tolerated. O'Donnell's outspokenness and spontaneousness sometimes led to her views being recirculated by other media outlets, often surprising The View co-hosts including O'Donnell. Frequently portrayed unfavorably by conservative media outlets and what she deemed as Republican pundits, O'Donnell lamented that they were focusing on her comments instead of more important national and world issues.

On December 5, 2006, O'Donnell used a series of ching chongs to imitate newscasters in China. Vanessa Hua of the San Francisco Chronicle expressed disappointment in O'Donnell, given the comedian's championing of LGBT rights. On December 14, O'Donnell apologized to those she offended, explaining that "Some people have told me it's as bad as the n-word. I was like, really? I didn't know that." O'Donnell warned that "there's a good chance I'll do something like that again, probably in the next week, not on purpose. Only 'cause it's how my brain works." Time called it a "pseudo-apology". O'Donnell later wrote in Celebrity Detox that "I wish I had been a bit more pure in my public apology."

In December 2006, O'Donnell criticized Donald Trump for holding a press conference to reinstate Miss USA Tara Conner, who had violated pageant guidelines, accusing him of using her scandal to "generate publicity for the Miss USA Pageant" (to which he owns the rights) by announcing he was giving her a second chance. O'Donnell commented that due to Trump's multiple marital affairs and questionable business bankruptcies, he was not a moral authority for young people in America. She stated, "Left the first wife, had an affair. Left the second wife, had an affair – but he's the moral compass for 20-year-olds in America." In response, Trump began a "vicious" mass media blitz in which he appeared on various television shows, either in person or by phone, threatening to sue O'Donnell (he never did). He called her names, threatened to take away her partner Kelli, and claimed that Barbara Walters regretted hiring her. Walters was stuck in the middle as a social acquaintance of Trump's, and said O'Donnell did not feel like Walters defended her enough, which led to what both women agreed was an unfortunate confrontation in one of the dressing rooms. "I had pain and hurt and rejection," O'Donnell said, "sometimes [my emotions] overwhelm me. Sometimes I get flooded." Walters denied that she was unhappy with O'Donnell, saying, "I have never regretted, nor do I now, the hiring of Rosie O'Donnell."

On April 25, 2007, ABC announced that O'Donnell would be leaving the show before the end of the year because of a failure to reach agreement on a new contract.

O'Donnell condemned many of the Bush administration's policies, especially the war in Iraq and the resulting occupation. She also questioned the official explanation for the destruction of the World Trade Center, and stating in one episode, "I do believe that it's the first time in history that fire has ever melted steel". She consistently mentioned recent military deaths and news about the war and criticized the U.S. media for its lack of attention to these issues compared to media coverage throughout the world. This led to a series of heated exchanges with co-host Hasselbeck, as well as "the most-discussed moment of her professional life." On May 17, 2007, O'Donnell rhetorically asked, "655,000 Iraqi civilians dead. Who are the terrorists? ... if you were in Iraq and another country, the United States, the richest in the world, invaded your country and killed 655,000 of your citizens, what would you call us?" Conservative commentators criticized O'Donnell's statements, saying that she was comparing American soldiers to terrorists. On May 23, 2007, a heated discussion ensued, in part, because of what O'Donnell perceived as Elisabeth Hasselbeck's unwillingness to defend O'Donnell from the criticisms; O'Donnell asked Hasselbeck, "Do you believe I think our troops are terrorists?" Hasselbeck answered in the negative but also stated "Defend your own insinuations." O'Donnell was hurt and felt Hasselbeck had betrayed her friendship: "there's something about somebody being different on TV toward you than they are in the dressing room. It didn't really ring true for me." O'Donnell stated that Republican pundits were mischaracterising her statements and the right-wing media would portray her as a bully, attacking "innocent pure Christian Elisabeth" whenever they disagreed. O'Donnell decided to leave the show that day, but afterwards stated that the reason was not the argument itself, but rather the fact that she saw on the studio monitor that the camera had shown a split screen, with her and Hasselbeck on either side. O'Donnell felt that the show's director and producer "had to prepare that in advance ... I felt there was setup egging me into that position. The executive producer and I did not gel." O'Donnell and ABC agreed to cut short her contract agreement on May 25, 2007. ABC News reported that her arguments with Hasselbeck brought the show its best ratings ever.

In May 2007, Time magazine included O'Donnell in their annual list of the 100 most influential people. O'Donnell was named "The Most Annoying Celebrity of 2007" by a PARADE reader's poll, in response she said, "Frankly, most celebrities are annoying ... and I suppose I am the most annoying, but, whatever."

In 2008, The View won an Emmy for "Outstanding Special Class Writing" for a specially themed Autism episode that O'Donnell helped create. Janette Barber, O'Donnell's longtime friend and producer/writer of The Rosie O'Donnell Show, accepted the award on behalf of herself and the other two winners, Christian McKiernan and Andrew Smith.

2007–2009: Jahero, America, Love, Loss, and What I Wore and Rosie Radio
In March 2007, O'Donnell started a video blog, Jahero, on her website Rosie.com answering fans questions, giving behind the scenes information and serving as a video diary. Originally featuring only O'Donnell and her hair and make-up artist Helene Macaulay they were soon joined by her writer from The Rosie O'Donnell Show, Janette Barber. Called Jahero, a name composed of the first two letters of each of their first names, they occasionally had short cameo appearances by View co-hosts Joy Behar, Elisabeth Hasselbeck, and Barbara Walters. Jenny McCarthy appeared once briefly, as has Hasselbeck's mother-in-law and O'Donnell's mother-in-law, her (now) ex-wife Kelli's mother. Kathy Griffin also appeared, where she read some of the questions. It became so popular that O'Donnell and her creative team considered an "on the road" version of the video blog using fan-submitted suggestions. O'Donnell was the front runner for the "best celebrity blogger" category in the 2007 Blogger's Choice Awards which she won.

O'Donnell expressed interest in replacing long-time host Bob Barker when he retired from CBS's game show The Price Is Right. Barker was a frequent guest on her talk show and told reporters that she "would make a fine host." Although it was reported he had "endorsed" her as a "possible successor", Barker said that he had no role in choosing his replacement. In June 2007, she announced on her blog it was not going to happen and noted she was reluctant to uproot her family to move to California.

In 2008, O'Donnell starred in and executive produced America, a Lifetime channel original movie in which she plays the therapist of the title character, a 16-year-old boy aging out of the foster care system. The film is based on the E.R. Frank book of the same name.

In October 2009, she appeared in the original cast of Love, Loss, and What I Wore.

In November 2009, "Rosie Radio", a daily two-hour show with O'Donnell discussing news and events on Sirius XM Radio, premiered. O'Donnell said she was approached by the company after she appeared on Howard Stern's Sirius XM show. The radio show ended in June 2011.

In 2009, O'Donnell made another guest appearance on Curb Your Enthusiasm, where she beat up Larry twice, in an episode titled Denise Handicapped.

2011–2012: The Rosie Show, Oprah Winfrey Network 
In 2011, O'Donnell began producing material for the Oprah Winfrey Network (OWN). In May 2011, The Doc Club with Rosie O'Donnell premiered, a show where O'Donnell moderated live panel discussions following premieres of OWN Documentaries. She has hosted specials for Becoming Chaz in May 2011 and Miss Representation in October 2011.

In fall 2011, O'Donnell began full-time work on her new show, The Rosie Show, for OWN. The show taped at the Chicago studio formerly home to The Oprah Winfrey Show. The show debuted on October 10, 2011, to generally positive reviews.

OWN canceled The Rosie Show on March 16, 2012, with the last show taped March 20, on the eve of O'Donnell's 50th birthday. The final show aired on OWN on March 29, 2012. In a statement, Oprah Winfrey said: 

O'Donnell responded to the cancellation by thanking her viewers and the host city of Chicago: 
In 2011, O'Donnell made another guest appearance on Curb Your Enthusiasm, competing for the affection of a bisexual woman with Larry in an episode called "The Bi-Sexual".

2013–2016: TV guest starring roles, recurring on The Fosters and return to The View
In 2013, O'Donnell appeared in a number of television shows. First, she played "brash but astute" reporter Dottie Shannon in an episode of Bomb Girls, followed by playing the voice of the Bouncing Bumble Queen in Jake and the Never Land Pirates. After that, also in 2013, she appeared in two episodes of Smash as herself. That same year she also appeared as herself in an episode of Impractical Jokers called "Everything's Rosie".

In 2014, O'Donnell landed a reoccurring role as Rita Hendricks on The Fosters, "a tough yet compassionate woman who works for the foster care system and becomes a mentor to a member of the Foster family." The character lasted through their 2016 season.

In the fall of 2014, O'Donnell returned to The View as a co-host, with a newly re-vamped version of the show, along with Whoopi Goldberg returning as moderator and new co-hosts Rosie Perez and Nicolle Wallace. On February 6, 2015, representatives for O'Donnell confirmed she would once again exit the panel, citing her reasons as a "personal decision". In a statement, made to The Hollywood Reporter, O'Donnell said, "[My health] got a little bit worse right before the holidays — [my doctor] was kind of concerned. ... I can't really fix [my personal life] right away, but I can fix [my job]."

In 2015, O'Donnell made a cameo in Pitch Perfect 2, playing a co-host on The View. Deadline called the cameo "a bit that already seems dated." That same year, she appeared in an episode of Empire, playing Pepper O'Leary, "a tough criminal who shared a cell for years with Cookie Lyon." In preparation for the role, she hired an acting coach and stated, "I prepared for this like I've never prepared for anything in my career, because I didn't want to disappoint and I understood the pace at which they work." O'Donnell also appeared as herself in two documentaries that same year. In April 2015, Roseanne For President! was released, a film about Roseanne Barr's presidential bid in 2012. O'Donnell appeared in the film alongside Michael Moore and Sandra Bernhard. In September 2015, the documentary Everything Is Copy was released, a film by Jacob Bernstein about his mother Nora Ephron. O'Donnell appeared in the documentary to help "bring his mother into focus" along with a number of other celebrities.

In 2016, O'Donnell made a two-episode appearance in the CBS series Mom, playing Jeanine, "the ex-girlfriend of Bonnie (Allison Janney)". That same year, she was also a regular panelist on Match Game and appeared in one episode of The $100,000 Pyramid, where she competed against Kathy Najimy. Later that year, O'Donnell also played the role of the gym teacher in Hairspray Live!

2017–present: Return to full-time acting on SMILF, I Know This Much Is True and American Gigolo 
In November 2016, Showtime announced she had joined the cast of the comedy pilot SMILF. The series aired from November 5, 2017, until March 31, 2019, and O'Donnell received critical acclaim for her portrayal of Tutu.

On April 3, 2019, it was announced that O'Donnell would play the role of Lisa Sheffer in the HBO television adaptation of Wally Lamb's I Know This Much Is True.

In 2021, O'Donnell guest starred on the series Run the World and The L Word: Generation Q. On June 15, 2021, it was announced that she would star as Detective Sunday, alongside Jon Bernthal, in a series reboot of American Gigolo on Showtime, premiering in 2022.

Other ventures

Rosie magazine

In 2000, O'Donnell partnered with the publishers of McCall's to revamp the magazine as Rosie's McCall's (or, more commonly, Rosie). The magazine was launched as a competitor to fellow talk show hostess Oprah Winfrey's monthly magazine O. Rosie covered issues including breast cancer, foster care, and other matters of concern to O'Donnell. In the September 2000 issue, she shared that "she has struggled with depression her entire life" and decided to start medications when she realized her fears were affecting her family. With a strong start and a circulation close to 3.5 million, things looked promising, but the magazine stumbled as conflicts emerged between O'Donnell and the editors. The contract gave O'Donnell control over editorial process and editorial staff but veto power remained with publisher Gruner+Jahr USA. O'Donnell quit the magazine in September 2002, following a dispute over editorial control. "If I'm going to have my name and my brand on the corner of a magazine, it has to be my vision" she told People.

Rosie magazine folded in 2003. In late 2003, O'Donnell and the publishers each sued the other for breach of contract. The publishers said that, by removing herself from the magazine's publication, she was in breach of contract. The trial received considerable press coverage. O'Donnell would often give brief press interviews outside of the courtroom responding to various allegations. Of note was a former magazine colleague and breast cancer survivor who testified that O'Donnell said to her on the phone that people who lie "get sick and they get cancer. If they keep lying, they get it again". O'Donnell apologized the next day and stated, "I'm sorry I hurt her the way I did, that was not my intention." The judge dismissed the case, ruling that neither side should receive damages.

Books
In 1997, Rosie released the children's book Kids are Punny: Jokes Sent by Kids to the Rosie O'Donnell Show, which contained jokes she had received from children. A sequel titled Kids are Punny 2: More Jokes Sent by Kids to the Rosie O'Donnell Show was released a year later in 1998, and an HBO special was made based on the books. In April 2002, O'Donnell released Find Me, a combination of memoir, mystery and detective story with an underlying interest in reuniting birth mothers with their children. In addition to cataloging her childhood and early adulthood, the book delved into O'Donnell's relationship with a woman with dissociative identity disorder who posed as an under-aged teen who had become pregnant by rape. The book reached number two on The New York Times bestseller list.

In October 2007, she released Celebrity Detox, her second memoir which focuses on the struggles with leaving fame behind, noting her exits from The Rosie O'Donnell Show and The View.

R Family Vacations
In 2003, O'Donnell and Carpenter partnered with travel entrepreneur Gregg Kaminsky to launch R Family Vacations catering to LGBT families, "the very first all gay and lesbian family vacation packages" where "gays and lesbians can bring their kids, their friends, and their parents." Although O'Donnell is not involved on a day-to-day basis, she does contribute to the creative aspects of "advertising and marketing materials" and initiated the idea for the company when she filled in as a last-minute replacement headliner on one of Kaminsky's Atlantis Events gay cruises and also came up with the name "R Family Vacations". On July 11, 2004, the first cruise was held with 1600 passengers including 600 children. In addition to traditional entertainment and recreational activities, the company partnered with Provincetown's Family Pride, a 25-year-old Washington, D.C.-based organization that advocates for LGBT families to host discussions on "adoption, insemination, surrogacy, and everything else that would be helpful to gay parenting." All Aboard! Rosie's Family Cruise, a documentary film about the trip debuted on HBO on April 6, 2006, and was nominated for three Emmy Awards. Of the experience, O'Donnell stated "we didn't really realize the magic that was going to take place. People who had never met another gay family met other families and it was powerful."

Taboo 
In late 2003, O'Donnell brought the musical Taboo to Broadway. She hired Charles Busch to re-write the book, and the story became "bitchier" and more focused on the rise to fame of the character based on Boy George. It closed on February 8, 2004, after about 100 performances and "mostly bad" reviews. O'Donnell described the show's production as "by far the most fulfilling experience of my career". She has stated that she intends to bring the show back to Broadway, although Scott Miller writes that people are hesitant to get involved after the "train wreck" of the original production.

Charitable work
Over her career, O'Donnell has developed a reputation for raising funds and her own philanthropy to charitable causes. In May 1996, Warner Books advanced O'Donnell $3 million to write a memoir. She used the money to seed her For All Kids Foundation to help institute national standards for day care across the country.

Since 1997, Rosie's For All Kids Foundation, overseen by Elizabeth Birch, has awarded more than $22 million in Early Childhood Care and Education program grants to over 900 nonprofit organizations. On October 30, 2006, she was honored by the New York Society for the Prevention of Cruelty to Children. "It's our privilege to be honoring and hosting Rosie," said NYSPCC president David Stack in a statement. "Her Rosie's for All Kids Foundation has awarded more than $22 million in grants to over 1,400 child-related organizations, and that's just one of her many impressive activities on behalf of children." In November 2006, Nightline aired a video report about the opening of The Children's Plaza and Family Center in Renaissance Village, a FEMA trailer park in Louisiana. This was an emergency response initiative of Rosie's For All Kids Foundation with the help of many local nonprofit organizations and for-profit businesses, all efforts were to assist the families displaced by Hurricane Katrina.

San Francisco public relations firm Fineman Associates awarded top prize to Procter & Gamble's designation of O'Donnell as "unkissable" in a promotion for Scope mouthwash on the 1997 annual list of the nation's worst public relations blunders. In response to the promotion, O'Donnell partnered with Warner–Lambert's competitor Listerine, who donated bottles of mouthwash to the studio audience and donated $1,000 to charity every time a hosted guest would kiss her in exchange for O'Donnell promoting their product. On occasion, the guests would offer multiple kisses, and People reported O'Donnell "smooched her way to more than $350,000."

In 2003, O'Donnell and Kelli O'Donnell collaborated with Artistic Director Lori Klinger to create Rosie's Broadway Kids, dedicated to providing free instruction in music and dance to New York City public schools or students. Rosie's Broadway Kids serves more than 4,500 teachers, students, and their family members at 21 schools. Currently, programs are in Harlem, Midtown West, Chelsea, Lower East Side, East Village, and Chinatown. All net profits from O'Donnell's 2007 book Celebrity Detox are also being donated to Rosie's Broadway Kids.

In December 2006, at a one-night charity event on the Norwegian Pearl cruise ship, Elizabeth Birch, executive director for the Rosie's For All Kids Foundation, confirmed that $50 million from O'Donnell's five-year contract were donated in an irrevocable trust to charity. She is also reported to have contributed several hundred thousand dollars for rehabilitation therapies for war veterans who have lost limbs in Iraq and Afghanistan wars. On The Tyra Banks Show, Banks brought up to O'Donnell that people don't realize that O'Donnell has given more than $100 million to charity. In May 2007, O'Donnell and Pogo.com announced a joint effort to raise money for Rosie's All Kids Foundation. EA, which owns Pogo.com, committed $30,000 and more money can be raised based on the amount of playing time people spend on certain games. They also held a sweepstakes in which winners get to fly to New York and meet O'Donnell and attend a charity function as her guest.

During the summer of 2007, O'Donnell was a guest on the multi-artist True Colors Tour, which traveled through 15 cities in the United States and Canada. The tour, sponsored by the gay cable channel Logo, began on June 8, 2007. Hosted by comedian Margaret Cho and headlined by Cyndi Lauper, the tour also included Debbie Harry, Erasure, The Gossip, Rufus Wainwright, The Dresden Dolls, The MisShapes, Indigo Girls, The Cliks, and other special guests. Profits from the tour helped to benefit the Human Rights Campaign as well as P-FLAG and The Matthew Shepard Foundation. She appeared again on True Colors Tour 2008.

Personal life
O'Donnell was a resident of Nyack, New York, after the purchase in 1996 of "Pretty Penny", a Victorian river home that had previously served as the home of Helen Hayes. O'Donnell sold the home to businessman Edward M. Kopko in 2000. She resides in South Nyack, New York, and owns a home in West Palm Beach, Florida.

O'Donnell is a Democrat. She has contributed funds to multiple political campaigns, including to the campaign to elect Senator Doug Jones of Alabama.

On numerous occasions, O'Donnell has been outspoken about controversial topics. In 2007, she announced her opinion concerning the terrorist attacks on the World Trade Center on September 11, 2001, in which she questioned the NIST conclusions, and alleged the U.S. government's involvement in the event.

Sexual orientation
In her January 31, 2002, appearance on the sitcom Will & Grace, she played a lesbian mom. A month later as part of her act at the Ovarian Cancer Research benefit at Caroline's Comedy Club O'Donnell came out as a lesbian, announcing "I'm a dyke! ... I don't know why people make such a big deal about the gay thing. ... People are confused, they're shocked like this is a big revelation to somebody." The announcement came two months before the end of her talk show. Although she also cited the need to put a face to gays and lesbians, her primary reason was to bring attention to LGBTQ adoption issues. O'Donnell is a foster and adoptive mother. She protested against adoption agencies, particularly in Florida, that refused adoptive rights to gay and lesbian parents.

Diane Sawyer interviewed O'Donnell in a March 14, 2002, episode of PrimeTime Thursday. O'Donnell told USA Today that she chose to talk to Sawyer because she wanted an investigative piece on Florida's ban on gay adoption. She told Sawyer if that was done, "I would like to talk about my life and how (the case) pertains to me." She spoke about two gay men in Florida who faced having a foster child they raised removed from their home. State law wouldn't let them adopt because Florida banned gay or bisexual couples from adopting. O'Donnell's coming out drew criticism from some LGBTQ activists who cited her repeated references to being enamored of Tom Cruise on The Rosie O'Donnell Show as deceptive. She responded in her act stating, "I said I wanted him to mow my lawn and bring me a lemonade. I never said I wanted to blow him." After leaving her show and coming out, O'Donnell returned to stand-up comedy and cut her hair. O'Donnell told the press that her haircut was meant to mimic the haircut of former Culture Club backup singer Helen Terry.

O'Donnell was named 2002's Person of the Year by The Advocate, and in May 2003 she became a regular columnist for the magazine. The magazine's editor-in-chief, Judy Wieder, stated, "Today, Rosie's long and brave journey has led her not only to the cover of The Advocate – Rosie was honored with the magazine's Person of the Year Award for 2002 – but now to its chorus of voices, as a columnist."

In September 2018, O'Donnell was criticized for using a "gay slur" in a September 26 tweet referring to Senator Lindsey Graham for his support of Brett Kavanaugh's confirmation as an Associate Justice of the United States Supreme Court. The quote was: "'f-- u u closeted idiot – this is the patriarchy exposed – this is reality deal with it !!#NoKavanaughConfirmation #NotMyPresident'". Kavanaugh was eventually confirmed.

Marriages and children
O'Donnell adopted her first child, Parker Jaren O'Donnell, as an infant in 1995. Later, Kelli Carpenter also adopted Parker. Parker is an aficionado of military history and in 2011 successfully lobbied his mother to send him to Valley Forge Military Academy.

On February 26, 2004, O'Donnell married Carpenter, a former Nickelodeon marketing executive, in San Francisco two weeks after Mayor Gavin Newsom authorized the granting of marriage licenses to same-sex couples. Her decision to go to San Francisco to marry Carpenter was seen as a show of defiance against then-President George W. Bush over his support for the Federal Marriage Amendment. She said in 2004, "We were both inspired to come here after the sitting President made the vile and hateful comments he made ... [O]ne thought ran through my mind on the plane out here – with Liberty and Social justice for all." The couple was married by San Francisco Treasurer Susan Leal, one of the city's highest ranking lesbian officials, and serenaded by the San Francisco Gay Men's Chorus. O'Donnell said during the trial over Rosie magazine she had decided to marry Carpenter, in part because even though they acted as spouses they legally were no closer than friends: "We applied for spousal privilege and were denied it by the state. As a result, everything that I said to Kelli, every letter that I wrote her, every e-mail, every correspondence and conversation was entered into the record ... I am now and will forever be a total proponent of gay marriage."

Carpenter and O'Donnell have four children together. In 2000, the family took in a foster child Mia (born in 1997), and announced intentions to adopt her. In 2001, the state of Florida removed Mia from their home, and O'Donnell has since worked extensively to bring an end to the Florida law prohibiting same-sex family adoption.

In mid-November 2009, O'Donnell disclosed that Carpenter had moved out of their home in 2007. Their marriage had ended in August 2004 when it was among the thousands voided by the California Supreme Court.

O'Donnell began dating 40-year-old executive-search consultant Michelle Rounds in mid-2011. On December 5, 2011, during a break in the taping of The Rosie Show, O'Donnell announced to her studio audience that she and Rounds were engaged. The two married in a private ceremony in New York on June 9, 2012. On January 9, 2013, the couple announced they had adopted a baby girl. On February 6, 2015, representatives for O'Donnell confirmed she and Rounds had separated in November of the previous year. In February 2015, O'Donnell filed for divorce from Rounds after two years of marriage. Their divorce was settled in October 2015. O'Donnell was awarded full custody of the child. Rounds died by suicide on September 15, 2017.

In August 2015, O'Donnell tweeted that her 17-year-old daughter, Chelsea, had gone missing from their Nyack, New York, home along with her therapy dog. Chelsea was found a week later in Barnegat, New Jersey.

Health
In the summer of 2000, O'Donnell suffered a staph infection after she accidentally cut the middle finger of her left hand with a knife while cutting a price tag off a fishing pole. The infection incapacitated her for weeks and nearly resulted in doctors amputating her hand. She later quipped that George W. Bush was to blame for the infection, saying that she was preparing to go on a fishing trip at the time to avoid seeing Bush on television during the then-ongoing 2000 Republican National Convention. O'Donnell has acknowledged her struggles with recurrent major depressive episodes during the fall and winter months consistent with seasonal affective disorder.

O'Donnell suffered a heart attack in mid-August 2012. She said an artery was 99 percent blocked and a stent was inserted. She later revealed on Twitter that to reverse her heart disease, she would espouse the whole-foods, plant-based diet promoted by Caldwell Esselstyn.

Awards and nominations
Daytime Emmy Awards
 1997 Outstanding Talk Show, The Rosie O'Donnell Show nominated
 1997 Outstanding Talk/Service Show Host, The Rosie O'Donnell Show won
 1998 Outstanding Talk Show, The Rosie O'Donnell Show won
 1998 Outstanding Talk/Service Show Host, The Rosie O'Donnell Show won (tied with Oprah Winfrey)
 1998 Outstanding Writing – Special Class, The Rosie O'Donnell Show nominated
 1999 Outstanding Talk Show, The Rosie O'Donnell Show won
 1999 Outstanding Talk Show Host, The Rosie O'Donnell Show won
 1999 Outstanding Writing – Special Class, The Rosie O'Donnell Show nominated
 2000 Outstanding Talk Show, The Rosie O'Donnell Show won
 2000 Outstanding Talk Show Host, The Rosie O'Donnell Show won
 2001 Outstanding Talk Show, The Rosie O'Donnell Show won
 2001 Outstanding Talk Show Host, The Rosie O'Donnell Show won (tied with Regis Philbin)
 2002 Outstanding Talk Show, The Rosie O'Donnell Show won
 2002 Outstanding Talk Show Host, The Rosie O'Donnell Show won
 2007 Outstanding Talk Show Host, Rosie O'Donnell, Barbara Walters, Joy Behar and Elisabeth Hasselbeck, The View nominated

Emmy Awards
 1995 Outstanding Individual Performance in a Variety or Music Program, Rosie O'Donnell (stand-up comedy special) nominated
 1996 Outstanding Guest Actress in a Comedy Series, The Larry Sanders Show nominated
 1999 Outstanding Children's Program, Kids Are Punny nominated
 1999 Outstanding Variety, Music or Comedy Special, 52nd Annual Tony Awards won
 2006 Outstanding Nonfiction Special, All Aboard! Rosie's Family Cruise nominated

Kids' Choice Awards
 1995 Favorite Movie Actress, The Flintstones won
 2000 Hall of Fame Award

Tony Award
 2014 Isabelle Stevenson Award "for her commitment to arts education for New York City's public school children."

Women in Film Crystal + Lucy Awards
 2002 Lucy Award in recognition of her excellence and innovation in her creative works that have enhanced the perception of women through the medium of television.

Filmography

Television

Film

Award ceremonies
 Nickelodeon Kids' Choice Awards (Host) (1996–2003)
 54th Annual Tony Awards (Host) (2000)
 41st Annual Grammy Awards (Host) (1999)
 42nd Annual Grammy Awards (Host) (2000)

Radio
 Rosie Radio SIRIUS XM (2009–11)

Theater
 Grease (1994) as Betty Rizzo at the Eugene O'Neill Theater
 Seussical (2001) (replacement for David Shiner)
 Pippin (2004) (World AIDS Day benefit concert)
 Fiddler on the Roof (2004) (replacement for Andrea Martin in 2005) as Golde
 No, No, Nanette (2008) (for Encores!)
 Love, Loss, and What I Wore (2009)
 Good for Otto by David Rabe (Off-Broadway, 2018), left production prior to opening due to illness
 The Music Man (the Kennedy Center, 2019) as Mrs. Paroo

Bibliography
 Find Me (2002)
 Celebrity Detox (2007)
 Rosie O'Donnell's Crafty U: 100 Easy Projects the Whole Family Can Enjoy All Year Long (2008)

Children's books 
 Kids are Punny: Jokes Sent by Kids to the Rosie O'Donnell Show (1997)
 Kids are Punny 2: More Jokes Sent by Kids to the Rosie O'Donnell Show (1998)

Discography

See also
 LGBT culture in New York City
 List of LGBT people from New York City

References

External links

 
 
 
 

 
1962 births
Living people
20th-century American comedians
21st-century American comedians
20th-century American actresses
21st-century American actresses
9/11 conspiracy theorists
Activists from New York City
Actresses from New York City
American conspiracy theorists
American feminists
American film actresses
American gun control activists
American musical theatre actresses
American people of Irish descent
American stand-up comedians
American television actresses
American women television producers
American television talk show hosts
American voice actresses
American women bloggers
American bloggers
American women comedians
Boston University alumni
Comedians from New York City
Daytime Emmy Award for Outstanding Talk Show Host winners
Former Roman Catholics
HIV/AIDS activists
American lesbian actresses
American LGBT broadcasters
Lesbian comedians
LGBT people from New York (state)
American LGBT rights activists
New York (state) Democrats
People from Bayside, Queens
People from Commack, New York
People from Saddle River, New Jersey
People from South Nyack, New York
Primetime Emmy Award winners
LGBT memoirists
VH1 people
Television producers from New Jersey
Television producers from New York City
American LGBT comedians